Richard Robert Segall III (born March 10, 1969) is an American film and television actor. He is best known for playing the singer Ricky Stevens in the American sitcom television series The Partridge Family.

Personal life, family and education  
Segall was born on Long Island, New York, the son of Rick and Barbara Segall. He and his family moved to Nashville, Tennessee in 1973.

Career 
Segall began performing at age two. He first acted at age five in a Tonka toys television commercial. In 1973 he joined the television series The Partridge Family as a regular cast member for its final season. Segall won the role after being spotted by Paul Tannen, who mentioned him to executive producer Bob Claver.  Segall appeared in ten episodes of The Partridge Family. While with The Partridge Family Segall had a record titled Ricky Segall and the Segalls released by Bell Records. 

In 1974, he was one of the hosts at the American Music Awards of 1974 along with Donny Osmond, Michael Jackson and Rodney Allen Rippy. 

Segall has guest-starred and provided voices in television programs including Police Woman, Trollkins (voices; 13 episodes), Shirt Tales (voices; 13 episodes), Richie Rich (voices) and Little House on the Prairie. 

Segall appeared in the films The Last Married Couple in America and Oh, God! Book II, among others. He was an executive producer for the 2015 film Selected. His most recent credit was from the police procedural television series NCIS.

References

External links 

Profile at Rotten Tomatoes

1969 births
Living people
People from Long Island
Male actors from New York (state)
American male film actors
American male television actors
American male voice actors
20th-century American male actors
21st-century American male actors